Newcastleton railway station served the village of Newcastleton, Scottish Borders, Scotland from 1862 to 1969 on the Border Union Railway.

History 
The station was opened on 1 March 1862 by the Border Union Railway. It was situated on the north side of the level crossing on Langholm Street. The goods yard was on the up side of the station and consisted of five sidings, all of which were loops, with a fifth short siding end-on to the large loading dock, where a goods shed made of stone was. The yard had a large quantity of timber traffic and, in the Second World War, two diesel locomotives were delivered to the Forestry Commission for light railway  use in the area. The goods yard closed on 9 October 1967 and the station closed along with the line on 6 January 1969.

References

External links 

Disused railway stations in the Scottish Borders
Railway stations in Great Britain opened in 1862
Railway stations in Great Britain closed in 1969
Beeching closures in Scotland
Former North British Railway stations
1862 establishments in Scotland
1969 disestablishments in Scotland